Mark Atkins may refer to:
Mark Atkins (musician) (born 1957), Australian Aboriginal musician
Mark Atkins (footballer) (born 1968), English former footballer
Mark Atkins (director), film director and editor of 100 Million BC
Mark Atkins (rugby union), rugby union player for Hawke's Bay Rugby Union